William Naylor is the producer of several music series for the BBC:
Dancing in the Street, about rock and roll (1996)
Walk On By, about pop music (2001)
Lost Highway: The History of American Country, about country music (2003)
Soul Deep, about rhythm and blues (2005)
Seven Ages of Rock, about rock music (2007)

References

Living people
Year of birth missing (living people)